Franz Emmerich Kaspar von Waldbott von Bassenheim (1626–1683) was the Prince-Bishop of Worms from 1679 to 1682.

Biography

Franz Emmerich Kaspar von Waldbott von Bassenheim was born in Bassenheim in 1626.  His father was the bailiff of the Electorate of Trier based in Lahnstein.

In 1637, he was made a canon of Mainz Cathedral.  He later received additional canonries at Speyer Cathedral and Worms Cathedral, where he eventually became provost.  He became the curator of Mainz Cathedral on 15 May 1679.

On 10 November 1679 the cathedral chapter of Worms Cathedral elected him to be the Prince-Bishop of Worms, with Pope Innocent XI confirming this appointment on 26 June 1681.  He died without having been consecrated as a bishop.

He died in Speyer on 11 July 1683 and is buried in Worms Cathedral.

References

1626 births
1683 deaths
Roman Catholic bishops of Worms